Chianocco is a comune (municipality) in the Metropolitan City of Turin in the Italian region Piedmont, located about  west of Turin in the Susa Valley.

Until the Fascist era, it was known as Chianoc.

References 

Cities and towns in Piedmont